Chris Scruggs (born Christopher Alan Davies-Scruggs December 16, 1982) is an American singer, songwriter, and multi-instrumentalist who plays a variety of instruments including guitar, steel guitar, bass, mandolin, fiddle, and drums. He is the youngest son of songwriter Gary Scruggs and singer/songwriter and producer Gail Davies. His paternal grandfather is bluegrass banjo wizard Earl Scruggs and his maternal grandfather is the late country singer Tex Dickerson.

Scruggs joined the country rock band BR549 in 2002 playing guitar and serving as the co-lead singer. While in the band, he wrote and performed the title track of their 2004 release, Tangled in the Pines. Scruggs remained in BR549 until 2005 when he left the band to pursue a solo career. Scruggs released his first solo album, entitled Anthem, in 2009 on Cogent Records.  Scruggs produced the album and wrote 11 of the 12 songs;  Ron Davies, Scruggs's uncle (best known for having penned "It Ain't Easy" for David Bowie) wrote the remaining song.

As a side musician, Scruggs has played behind many notable artists including Charlie Louvin, Andrew Bird, Ray Price, Robbie Fulks, Jools Holland, Giant Sand, Peter Noone, Bobby Bare, M. Ward, Michael Nesmith, She & Him, Billy Walker, Suzy Bogguss and Marty Stuart.

Scruggs is currently the bass guitarist in Marty Stuart's Fabulous Superlatives band, taking over for Paul Martin in 2015.

References

External links
 

1982 births
Living people
Pedal steel guitarists
American country rock singers
American country singer-songwriters
American multi-instrumentalists
21st-century American singers
21st-century guitarists
The Fabulous Superlatives members